Tennis competitions at the 2011 Pan American Games in Guadalajara were held from October 17 to October 22 at the Telcel Tennis Complex. The draw for the events was conducted on October 16, 2011.

The event was part of the qualification criteria for the tennis tournament at the 2012 Summer Olympics. The winners of the five competitions had priority entrance into the tennis event, if they were not directly qualified and were near the top 56 in the world. The players also had to be from a country that had not filled its four player quota.

The mixed doubles event was being held for the first time since the 1995 Pan American Games in Mar del Plata, because the event was added to the tennis program of the 2012 Summer Olympics in London, Great Britain.

Schedule

Medal summary

Medal table

Medal events

Qualification

Countries can enter a maximum of six athletes, three men and three women. 42 men and 28 women were selected through the ATP and WTA rankings (on August 29, 2011). There was a further six wild cards available for men and four for the women. Each of the players could be entered in two events. From each country, there could be a maximum of three players in the singles draws, while there could be a maximum of one doubles team in each of the doubles draws. Seeding was based on ATP and WTA rankings at the time of the draw (October 16).

References

 
Pan American Games
2011
Events at the 2011 Pan American Games